Space, Love, & Bullfighting is a studio album released by the American eclectic rock band Havalina in 2002.

Track listing
 "Space And Mexico" (2:44)
 "Losing You" (4:36)
 "Leica" (1:40)
 "Pluto" (4:42)
 "I Feel Nothing" (1:35)
 "You Got Me Cry'n" (4:30)
 "Rocket Ship" (3:01)
 "Worst Days" (3:26)
 "If You'd Like..." (5:02)
 "Bullfighter" (4:27)
 "Carlos" (4:43)
 "Spaces And Places" (5:36)
 "Space, Love And Bullfighting Suite" (6:03, in 5 parts):
Powerful Mexi Radio (Wignall)
That Bohemian Music (Maust)
Untitled (Nieto)
Space Cabana (Stevens)
The Other World Is Present (Greenhill)

All songs written by Havalina.

Credits

Havalina lineup
 Matt Wignall: Guitar, primary vocalist, reel, noise
 Orlando Greenhill: Bass guitar and double bass, noise, timpani
 David Maust: farfisa, Moog and hurdy gurdy
 Erick Nieto: drums, violin
 Mercedes Stevens: guitar, vocals, cello, castanets, shaker

Guest musicians
 Steve Hodges: marimba, clave, and other percussion on "Losing You", glockenspiel on "Leica", percussion on "Bullfighter", congas, shakers, and other percussion on "Carlos".
 Ivor Vejar: vocals on "You Got Me Cry'n" and "Powerful Mexi Radio"
 Curly Allsup: vocals on "You Got Me Cry'n"
 Mark Cole: bongos on "Worst Days"
Matt Clatterbuck: Violin on "If You'd Like..." and "Bullfighter"
Paul Justice: Trumpet on "Bullfighter"
Kevin Laurence Barrans: Theremin on "Powerful Mexi Radio"
Tim Stevens: guitar sounds and bird calls on "Space Cabana"

Other
Recorded and produced at Tackyland LBC by Matt Wignall.
All songs mixed by Matt Wignall, except "Space and Mexico", "Bullfighter", "You Got Me Cry'n", "Rocketship", and "Pluto" mixed by Anthony Arvisu.
Mastered by Mike Mierau at Vision Mastering.
Grady McFerrin - Cover illustration.

References

2002 albums
Havalina albums
Concept albums
Tooth & Nail Records albums